Arthur Gunnar Lönnqvist (4 January 1891 Helsinki – 26 December 1978 Helsinki) was a Finnish photographer and businessman.

Lönnqvist started his career as an atelier photographer, but soon turned into amateur photography. He photographed his home city Helsinki and the surrounding countryside's landscapes and people. Lönnqvist also photographed in other Finnish cities and during his travels in Europe. He is known especially of photographs taken during the battle of Helsinki in the Finnish Civil War in April 1918. Lönnqvist has won several photography awards in Finland and abroad.

Lönnqvist was involved in amateur photography already as a young man. After he finished school he started working in 1904 at photographer Daniel Nyblin's camera accessories shop Suomen Valokuvaustarvikekauppa (Ab Finska Fotografiska Magasinet in Swedish). Lönnqvist began work as an office clerk, copyist and photographic assistant and also served as the head of the photograph laboratory. In the year 1915 he married Ida Järvenpää (1893–1970). They had 6 children. In 1919 Lönnqvist became the procurator at Suomen Valokuvaustarvikekauppa and later in the 1920s he became the company's managing director. In 1933 Lönnqvist founded the company Oy Valovarjo Ab and was engaged as the managing director until the age of 75. The company became the head agency for Kodak-products in Finland.

Beginning from the year 1909 Lönnqvist was actively involved in the Amatörfotografklubben photograph club. He was awarded the club's honorary membership.

References

Bibliography

External links 
 
 
 
 

20th-century Finnish photographers
History of photography
1891 births
1978 deaths